The Irish Football Association Challenge Cup, commonly referred to as the Irish Cup (currently known as the Samuel Gelston's Whiskey Irish Cup for sponsorship purposes) is the primary football knock-out cup competition in Northern Ireland. Inaugurated in 1881, it is the fourth-oldest national cup competition in the world. Prior to the break-away from the Irish Football Association by clubs from what would become the Irish Free State in 1921, the Irish Cup was the national cup competition for the whole of Ireland.

Since 30 November 2021, the cup has been sponsored by Samuel Gelston's Irish Whiskey. It was previously sponsored by Nationwide Building Society, Bass Ireland Ltd, JJB Sports, Tennent's Lager and Sadler's Peaky Blinder. 126 clubs entered the 2018–19 competition.

Crusaders are the current holders, after they defeated Ballymena United 2–1 in the 2022 final to win the competition for a 5th time.

Format 
During the cup's history, different formats and rules have been used in respect of eligibility to enter the competition, the number of teams and rounds, replays, extra time, penalties, etc. The competition is open to all IFA-affiliated clubs with intermediate or senior status. Clubs obtain such status by meeting minimum criteria laid down by the IFA in respect of facilities, etc. Each club, for example, must have its own enclosed ground. The competition usually begins in August or September with the first qualifying round, and ends with the final in May of the following year. Clubs from level 3 (the NIFL Premier Intermediate League) and all regional league entrants from level 4 and below enter in the first qualifying round. These clubs play against each other over four qualifying rounds, until 8 clubs remain. The 8 fourth qualifying round winners then join the 24 senior clubs from levels 1 and 2 of the Northern Ireland Football League in the first round of the main competition, which consists of 32 clubs and is played in January.

The competition has always been played in a randomly-drawn knock-out format. Depending on the number of entrants, the draw sometimes necessitates byes in the earlier rounds. If a team receives a bye, they automatically get drawn first in the following round to avoid the possibility of a team receiving multiple byes. The team drawn first from each tie hosts the match, except in the case of an intermediate team from level 3 or below being drawn first against a senior team from levels 1 or 2. In that scenario, the tie is played at the ground of the 'senior' team. In all ties that finish level after 90 minutes, extra time is played and (if necessary) penalties are used to decide the winner. Both semi-finals and the final are usually played at Windsor Park.

The winners qualify to represent Northern Ireland in the following season's UEFA Europa Conference League, subject to the club attaining a UEFA licence. However, if they have already qualified for a UEFA competition by finishing as champions or runners-up of the NIFL Premiership, or if they do not attain a UEFA licence, the Irish Cup's Europa Conference League berth is redistributed to the third-placed Premiership club, and the 4th–7th placed clubs participate in the Premiership's Europa Conference League play-offs.

History
The Irish Cup was inaugurated in the 1880–81 season, with seven clubs taking part. The draw for the first round took place on 10 January 1881, with the first ever Irish Cup matches being played on 5 February 1881. The trophy was first awarded to Moyola Park (from Castledawson in County Londonderry) when they beat Cliftonville (from Belfast) 1–0 in the final at Cliftonville Cricket Ground, Belfast on 9 April 1881. Since its inception, the Irish Cup has always been, and continues to be, considered the most important such competition in Northern Ireland (and, prior to 1921, Ireland), second only to the NIFL Premiership. The cup final is the climax of the domestic season in Northern Ireland and usually attracts the biggest attendance of any club match.

Since the inception of the Irish Football League in 1890–91 (and excluding the First and Second World War years when the League was suspended), the Cup has been won by Irish League clubs on every occasion except three famous ‘giant-killing’ occasions when "junior" clubs beat senior opponents in the final: in 1928, Willowfield beat Larne 1–0; in 1955, Dundela beat Glenavon 3–0; and in 1976, Carrick Rangers beat Linfield 2–1. In the early years, Army regiments stationed in Ireland entered teams such as King's Own Rifles (Cork), three of which reached the final: the Gordon Highlanders in 1890, the Black Watch (Limerick) in 1892 and the Sherwood Foresters (Curragh, County Kildare) in 1897. The Gordon Highlanders were the only Army team to win the Cup.

Between 1881 and 1921 when the Irish Cup was an all-Ireland competition, southern clubs (from what would become the Irish Free State and later the Republic of Ireland) only won the competition four times out of a possible 41: Shelbourne (from Dublin) won three times (in 1906, 1911 and 1920); and Bohemians (also from Dublin) won it in 1908. There were two all-southern finals: Bohemians defeating Shelbourne in 1908, and Shelbourne defeating Bohemians in 1911 (both ties required replays). Shelbourne, Bohemians and Derry City are the only clubs to win both the Irish Cup and the FAI Cup. Other Dublin clubs to compete in the Irish Cup were Dublin University, St. James's Gate, Dublin Association, Tritonville and Richmond Rovers.

In the second competition in 1881–82, Queen's Island became the first Belfast club to win the Cup and it did not leave Belfast again for another 24 years, when in 1905–06, Shelbourne became the first club from Dublin to win it. Of the 141 competitions played to date, Belfast clubs have won the cup 104 times; 73.8% of all competitions. The last time a club from outside Belfast won the cup was in 2018, when Coleraine beat Cliftonville 3–1 to win the cup for the sixth time. The cup's most successful club from outside Belfast is Glenavon, with seven wins.

In the early years of the competition the final was played at several different venues in Belfast, including the Oval, Solitude, Grosvenor Park and Celtic Park, as well as Dalymount Park in Dublin. Since 1996, the final has been played exclusively at Windsor Park, except for the 2015 and 2021 finals. The 2015 final had to be switched to the Oval, following the discovery of damage to a stand at the usual Windsor Park venue, while the 2021 final was moved to Mourneview Park, Lurgan for the first time due to maintenance works at Windsor Park, including a new playing surface being laid. This was the first final to be played outside Belfast since 1975, when Coleraine won the Cup with a 1–0 victory over Linfield in the second replay, after 1–1 and 0–0 draws in the first two games. The first final ever played outside Belfast took place in 1903, when Distillery won their 7th Irish Cup with a 3–1 victory over Bohemians at Dalymount Park, Dublin.

All six counties in Northern Ireland have been represented in the final. Moyola Park from County Londonderry were inaugural winners in 1881. In 1921, Glenavon became the first club from County Armagh to reach the final, but no club from Armagh won the Cup until Glenavon in 1957. County Down's first Cup finalists and winners were Ards in 1927; and County Antrim's were Ballymena in 1929. In 2007, Dungannon Swifts became the first club from County Tyrone to reach the final, and in 2019, Ballinamallard United became the first team from County Fermanagh to reach the final, completing the set.

Prior to replays being abolished in the final, a replay was required to decide the winner of 21 finals, the first in 1890 after Cliftonville and the Gordon Highlanders drew 2–2. Of the 21 finals to be replayed, eight of them required a second replay to separate the two finalists. The last time this occurred, and the last final replay ever played before they were abolished was in 1993, when Bangor defeated Ards 1–0 after two 1–1 draws. It was decided after this that there should only be one replay in which penalties would be used to determine the winner if necessary, and eventually the rules were changed to remove final replays altogether, with penalties being used if necessary after extra time in the first match. The first (and to date, only) final to be won on penalties took place in 2007, when Linfield beat Dungannon Swifts 3–2 on penalties following a 2–2 draw after extra time. In 2014, the rules were changed to abolish replays from the entire competition. All ties level after 90 minutes now use 30 minutes of extra time, and if necessary, a penalty shoot-out to determine the winner.

The final was not played on three occasions: 
 In 1912, Linfield were awarded the Cup after the other three semi-finalists (Cliftonville, Glentoran and Shelbourne) resigned from the IFA in a dispute over the amount of money paid to Linfield for hosting international matches.
 In 1920, Shelbourne, who had beaten Glenavon in one semi-final, were awarded the Cup after the other semi-final was declared null and void as both of the clubs involved were ejected from the competition: Belfast Celtic after Celtic fans fired shots at Glentoran supporters during a riot, and Glentoran for fielding an unlisted player.
 In 1999, Portadown were awarded the Cup when the other finalists, Cliftonville, were ejected from the competition after it was discovered that they had fielded an ineligible player, Simon Gribben, during the earlier rounds.

A total of 24 different clubs have won the Cup, but only 13 clubs have done so more than once. 34 different clubs have reached the final, with 12 of them appearing only once. Of those 12 clubs, five of them have won the Cup in their sole final appearance. On five occasions the same two clubs have reached the final in consecutive years: in 1885 and 1886, Distillery and Alexander; in 1913 and 1914, Glentoran and Linfield; in 1930 and 1931, Ballymena United and Linfield; Coleraine and Glentoran in 2003 and 2004; and in 2011 and 2012 Linfield and Crusaders. The most common final has been between Glentoran and Linfield, which has occurred 15 times. Linfield have won eight of the meetings, with Glentoran winning seven. The last time both clubs reached the final was in 2006, when Linfield won 2–1.

In 2001, the final was broadcast live on television for the first time on BBC Northern Ireland and has been on every occasion since

Windsor Park has hosted the most finals (75, including replays), followed by The Oval with 25, and Solitude with 23.

Records
Most wins: 44, Linfield

Most consecutive wins: 4, Glentoran (1985, 1986, 1987 & 1988)

Most appearances in a final: 64, Linfield

Most consecutive appearances in a final: 5, Linfield (1891, 1892, 1893, 1894 & 1895)

Most defeats in a final: 21, Linfield

Most consecutive defeats in a final: 3, Linfield (1975, 1976 & 1977)

Biggest win in a final: Linfield 10–1 Bohemians (1895)

Longest gap between wins in a final: 70 years, Cliftonville (1909 and 1979)

Longest gap between appearances in a final: 55 years, Bangor (1938 and 1993)

Most appearances in a final without winning: 6, Larne (1928, 1935, 1987, 1989, 2005 & 2021)

Most common pair of finalists: Glentoran v Linfield – 15 times (1899, 1913, 1914, 1916, 1919, 1923, 1932, 1942, 1945, 1966, 1973, 1983, 1985, 2001 & 2006)

Final results
Key:

Winners marked with ** denotes a league and cup double

Statistics

Performance by club
Clubs in italics no longer compete for the cup. Either they no longer exist, or they now play under the jurisdiction of the League of Ireland

Total cups won by town or city
24 different clubs have won the cup, with the overwhelming majority of winners being clubs from Belfast.

Final venues
There have been 139 Irish Cup finals contested during the 142 competitions completed thus far, as the final was not played on three occasions. In addition, 29 final replays have been contested, for a total of 168 matches played at thirteen different grounds. Windsor Park has been the most common venue, having hosted 76 finals including replays.

Notes

References

External links
 Northern Ireland Cup Finals – RSSSF
Irish League Archive - Irish Cup

 
2
Northern Ireland
Former All-Ireland association football competitions
Recurring sporting events established in 1881
1881 establishments in Ireland